Coalburg may refer to the following unincorporated communities in the United States:

Coalburg, Alabama
Coalburg, West Virginia
Coalburg, Ohio

See also
Passaic Junction (rail yard), a rail yard known in the 19th century as Coalburg Junction